The 2015–17 FIBA–EuroLeague Basketball controversy was a dispute between FIBA and Euroleague Basketball over control of the premier Europe-wide professional club basketball competition.

Background

The EuroLeague was originally established by FIBA Europe, and it operated under its umbrella from 1958 until summer 2000, concluding with the 1999–00 season. That was when the richest and most popular European basketball clubs created Euroleague Basketball.

FIBA had never trademarked the "EuroLeague" name, even though it had used that name for the competition since the mid-nineties. The leading European clubs therefore used the Euroleague name for their new competition which started in 2000. FIBA responded by launching their new Suproleague competition. 

Most of the leading clubs joined Euroleague, although Panathinaikos, Maccabi Tel Aviv and CSKA Moscow stayed with FIBA. Following the 2000–01 season it was clear that ULEB (Euroleague Basketball) were in a stronger position than FIBA Europe, and Suproleague was discontinued after a single season.

In November 2004, FIBA and EuroLeague officially came to an agreement, to take effect as of the 2005–06 season. FIBA agreed to sanction the two top Euro tournaments, but these would be run by ULEB, whilst FIBA would directly run the other European club tournaments.

Controversy
In June 2015, FIBA announced it would start a new league to compete with Euroleague Basketball's second-tier EuroCup. In July 2015, FIBA also tried to take the helm of the EuroLeague, by trying to convince eight of the eleven teams with a EuroLeague A-Licence to play in a new FIBA competition instead of the EuroLeague. This proposal was unanimously rejected by the Euroleague clubs.

In October 2015, FIBA attempted to take back control of Europe's first-tier club competition, proposing the Basketball Champions League, a new league that would have 16 teams, playing in a round-robin format, and granting eight guaranteed spots to different clubs.

In November 2015, Euroleague Basketball agreed to a 10-year marketing joint venture with IMG. In its press release, the EuroLeague announced a new competition format for the 2016–17 season, with only 16 teams, including the eleven A-license clubs (Anadolu Efes, Baskonia, CSKA Moscow, FC Barcelona, Fenerbahçe, Maccabi Tel Aviv, Olimpia Milano, Olympiacos, Panathinaikos, Real Madrid, and Žalgiris), playing in only one group, with a double round-robin, a true league format, with the top eight placed teams from the regular season then playing in a best-of-five playoffs round to decide qualification to the 2017 EuroLeague Final Four.

After its initial proposal was rejected by the EuroLeague clubs, FIBA changed the format of the Basketball Champions League, with qualification based on performance. This competition was officially launched on 22 March 2016.

Threats of suspension of 14 national teams
Despite the offer of FIBA to all European national basketball federations, many clubs instead agreed with EuroLeague to participate in the 2016–17 EuroLeague, or 2016–17 EuroCup. Regional leagues like the Adriatic League and VTB United League, as well as many national domestic leagues, signed contracts with Euroleague Basketball for the right to participate in its competitions.

Because of this support for EuroLeague, FIBA threatened to suspend 14 European basketball federations from EuroBasket 2017. Notified national organisations were given a five-day period, until 20 April 2016, to explain their stance on the situation.
These federations are:

On 16 April 2016, FIBA asked Germany to take over the hosting of the 2016 FIBA World Olympic Qualifying Tournament from Italy, which was at risk of suspension. In the end, no suspensions were applied.

Reactions to the possible suspension

Greece
Georgios Nikolaou, director of communications of AEK Athens, after its defeat against PAOK, in the first game of the Greek League quarterfinals, stated that his club, "will not be blackmailed by anyone, and doesn’t get any kind of messages by anyone".

Lithuania
On 20 April 2016, the Lithuanian Basketball Federation suspended BC Lietuvos rytas for their agreement with EuroLeague. Subsequently, the club from Vilnius would be disqualified from the Lithuanian Basketball League (LKL). Remigijus Milašius, president of the LKL, refuted their arguments and said that, FIBA "promised a lot of money, which they do not even have".

Šarūnas Jasikevičius, head coach of Lithuanian team BC Žalgiris, argued that "playing in a FIBA tournament means taking a 20-year step back".

Russia
Andrei Kirilenko, president of the Russian Basketball Federation, requested the VTB United League to suspend the participation of all Russian teams in EuroCup. He also said the contract with VTB would be voided if the league refuses.

Spain
Francisco Roca, president of the Spanish ACB, said, "the ban is unfair and unfounded", and said that there is not any ban for Spanish teams from playing in FIBA competitions, despite agreeing to the contract with Euroleague Basketball.

The Spanish Basketball Federation (FEB) requested that the ACB suspend its agreement with the EuroLeague. The ACB answered again to the FEB, stating that it cannot impede Spanish clubs from joining their tournaments, and that the possible suspension of the Spanish national team was not its fault.

On 13 May 2016, the Supreme Council for Sports of Spain unilaterally cancelled the agreement between the ACB and EuroLeague, with the aim to avoid the suspension to the men's national team. The Clubs Association (ACB) regretted the action of the Council, arguing that it restricts the clubs' freedom to choose the competition that they want to play in. Also, it reminded that FIBA did not explain the reasons for the possible suspension.

Slovenia
The Slovenian Basketball Federation, despite the possible suspension of its national team, supports FIBA in "its efforts to take action against ECA’s allegedly anti-competitive and illegal practices", but does not understand the suspension, as the Federation does not have any rights in the Adriatic League.

Suspension of the recognition of the ABA League
On 13 April 2016, The ABA League, comprising teams from the former SFR Yugoslavia, agreed with EuroLeague on a four-year contract, for one EuroLeague and three EuroCup spots.

Because of this agreement, FIBA threatened to suspend the six national federations with teams in the ABA League, and on 30 April 2016, it suspended its recognition of the ABA League. This official recognition was in place since 2009. Krešimir Novosel, director of the ABA League, said that he was unsure about FIBA's reasons for suspending recognition of the league, after the ABA had reformed its league to follow the criteria of the International Federation.

Collaboration proposals
On 3 May 2016, EuroLeague presented a collaboration proposal to FIBA, with the integration of the International Federation into the EuroLeague governance, and the possibility of accepting the new playing windows schedule for the FIBA World Cup qualifying games as main points.

Two days later, FIBA sent a letter to EuroLeague, requesting that they agree that FIBA's newly formed competition (the Champions League) become the new European-wide second-tier competition, instead of the EuroCup, that they agree to the new FIBA national team calendar and make the necessary adjustments to its new playing windows schedule, and that they would agree on the future expansion of the EuroLeague to 24 teams in upcoming seasons.

Threats of suspension of teams

Israel
On 28 June 2016, the Israel Basketball Association (IBA) informed that Hapoel Jerusalem, which signed a contract to participate in the EuroCup, would not be allowed to register and play in the Israeli Basketball Premier League. In response, Maccabi Tel Aviv, one of the teams with an A-license to play in the EuroLeague, announced that, in that case, they would also refuse to register to the Premier League.

Italy
In July 2016 it was announced that Reggio Emilia, Dinamo Sassari, Trento and Cantu would be withdrawing from the EuroCup. Had the teams not pulled out of EuroCup they would have been excluded from Serie A, as a result of a FIBA rule placed on the national basketball federations.

Russia
On 27 June 2016, just after participants of the 2016–17 EuroLeague and EuroCup Basketball were revealed, Andrei Kirilenko, president of the Russian Basketball Federation, announced that the four Russian participants in EuroCup (Khimki, Lokomotiv Kuban, Nizhny Novgorod, and Zenit Saint Petersburg) would be disqualified from national domestic competitions (like the Russian Cup), and that their players would be banned from playing with the Russian national team.

Spain
On 2 August 2016, Jorge Garbajosa, recently elected as president of the Spanish Basketball Federation, sent a letter to the six Spanish clubs that were registered in the EuroCup (Bilbao, Fuenlabrada, Gran Canaria, Málaga, Murcia, and Valencia), accusing them of violating the rules of Spain's Supreme Council of Sports. This organisation of the Spanish government had previously cancelled the ACB-EuroLeague agreement.

Greece
The Hellenic Basketball Federation initially threatened to ban AEK Athens from the Greek Basket League, if it did not switch from the EuroCup to FIBA's Basketball Champions League. The Hellenic Basketball Federation stated that they were sent a letter by FIBA, that demanded that they make such threats. After AEK initially refused to switch to the Champions League, the Hellenic Basketball Federation then refused to grant any Greek League player licenses (meaning they could not play in the Greek League) for all of AEK's new summer signings, if they remained in the EuroCup. As a result of this, AEK had no other choice but to withdraw from the EuroCup and switch to the Champions League.

Expansion of the Basketball Champions League
On 19 August 2016, FIBA announced the expansion of its Basketball Champions League to 40 teams in the regular season, after allowing AEK Athens, Partizan and Stelmet Zielona Góra to play in it. The three teams previously withdrew from the EuroCup, weeks after this competition had already established the groups and the calendar schedule of the games.

As consequence of this, the EuroCup reduced its competition to 20 teams.

Return to threats of suspension of national teams
In November 2016, FIBA sent new letters to the national federations from Slovenia, Montenegro and Macedonia asking them to take measures against clubs which compete in the EuroCup. After this, The Montenegrin Federation suspended Budućnost VOLI from all domestic competitions due to their participation in EuroCup.

Promotion from Basketball Champions League to EuroLeague
In November 2016, FIBA returned to talk with Euroleague Basketball to express their wish to want a Euroleague spot to the Champions League winner, but Euroleague Basketball CEO replied to FIBA’s proposal, because he understands that this would mean the jump from the European third division to the European first division in an attempt to finish with the EuroCup.

Return of Italian, French and Turkish clubs to EuroCup
In January 2017, the Italian clubs wanted to return EuroCup. In February 2017, the French clubs also wanted to return EuroCup, despite the wishes of the French basketball federation that is one of the most faithful supporters of Basketball Champions League. In March 2017, the Italian Federation said that it will give freedom to join any European competition from 2017–18 based on sports merit. Days later, the Turkish Basketball Federation made the same statement and French club ASVEL Basket, chaired by NBA player Tony Parker, confirmed it will join EuroCup.

National teams windows
For the 2019 World Cup, FIBA established a new qualification system, using six weekends during the 2017–18 and 2018–19 seasons, when the qualifiers will interrupt the club competitions. 

In May 2017, the National Basketball Association made a statement that the NBA teams will not loan their players to the national teams. Days later, Euroleague Basketball's CEO Jordi Bertomeu made the same statement.

See also
 2015–16 Eurocup Basketball
 2015–16 FIBA Europe Cup
 2016–17 EuroLeague
 2016–17 EuroCup Basketball
 2016–17 Basketball Champions League
 EuroBasket 2017

References

External links
 FIBA
 Euroleague Basketball

FIBA
EuroLeague
Basketball controversies
2015–16 in European basketball
2016–17 in European basketball
2015 controversies
2016 controversies
2017 controversies